George Ndaira (born 22 February 1985) is an Australian former professional rugby league footballer who played in the 2000s and 2010s and the current head coach of the Newtown Jets.

Background
George Ndaira was born in Sydney, New South Wales, Australia, he has Lebanese ancestors, and eligible to play for Lebanon due to the grandparent rule.

Rugby league career

Playing career
Ndaira was a part of the 2005 St George Illawarra Dragons Jersey Flegg Grand Final side. He played his school football at Marist College Kogarah and was coached by Dave Callander and Mark Hildebrandt.

He made his first grade debut in 2006 for the St George Illawarra Dragons. He played three first grade games with the Dragons. In 2007, joined the Sydney Roosters, however, he did not play a first grade game for the club, playing mostly in the reserve grade team. In 2008, he joined South Sydney Rabbitohs, playing fourteen games for the club in the season, and scoring four points (by kicking two goals).

In 2009, he joined the Newcastle Knights. He played there for two seasons. After the 2010 season, Ndaira was released from the Knights so he could sign with local Newcastle club, Kurri Kurri Bulldogs. However, this was short-lived, and he joined the Wests Tigers in 2011. While waiting for a spot in the Tigers' first grade team, he played for the Tigers' feeder side in the NSW Cup. After failing to reach first-grade for the Tigers, Ndaira again signed with Kurri Kurri for the 2012 season, as the captain-coach.

In 2015, Ndaira was an assistant coach for the Newcastle Knights New South Wales Cup side. During the season, he was asked to come out of retirement by head coach Matt Lantry, after the side suffered a number of injuries. He subsequently went on to play in the Knights' 2015 New South Wales Cup Grand Final win over the Wyong Roos.

Representative career
Ndaira played for Lebanon in the 2008 Rugby League World Cup qualifiers however Lebanon drew with Ireland and did not qualify.  George's moved from his usual position of Hooker to Half Back whilst playing in the Qualifiers and earned two Man of the Match performances against Wales & Ireland before his side bowed out against Samoa.

Career highlights
 Junior Club: Arncliffe Scots
 Round 3, 2008: Ndaira scored his first points in first grade (kicking a goal)

Coaching career
Ndaira captain-coached the Kurri-Kurri Bulldogs, who played in the local Newcastle Rugby League competition. He began this role in 2012 and lasted for two years.

In 2014, Ndaira became an assistant coach for the Newcastle Knights New South Wales Cup team. He remained there until the end of 2016. In 2017, he joined the Newtown Jets as their assistant coach, and stayed there until the end of 2021.

In 2022, he became the coach for the Cronulla Sutherland Sharks Jersey Flegg Cup (under 21's) team.

In 2023, he was appointed the head coach of the Newtown Jets rugby league team following the resignation of Greg Matterson

References

External links
 George Ndaira Official Player Profile
 Daleeaustralia.com
 Leaguehq.com.au

1985 births
Living people
Australian people of Lebanese descent
Australian rugby league coaches
Australian rugby league players
Balmain Ryde-Eastwood Tigers players
Central Coast Centurions players
Kurri Kurri Bulldogs players
Lebanon national rugby league team captains
Lebanon national rugby league team players
Newcastle Knights players
North Sydney Bears NSW Cup players
Rugby league halfbacks
Rugby league hookers
Rugby league players from Sydney
South Sydney Rabbitohs players
St. George Illawarra Dragons players